The 2002 St Helens Metropolitan Borough Council election took place on 2 May 2002 to elect members of St Helens Metropolitan Borough Council in Merseyside, England. One third of the council was up for election and the Labour Party stayed in overall control of the council.

After the election, the composition of the council was:
Labour 33
Liberal Democrats 15
Conservative 5
Socialist Labour 1

Background
Before the election Labour held a 16-seat majority on the council, with 18 seats being contested in 2002. Among the councillors who were defending seats at the election was the Liberal Democrat group leader Brian Spencer.

In an attempt to increase turnout, primary school children in the 2 wards with the lowest turnout in previous elections, Blackbrook and West Sutton were given balloons with the date of election printed on them to remind their parents of the election date. Access to polling places had also been improved and there was greater publicity about the availability of postal voting, which led to 5,086 requests for postal votes compared to 1,100 at the last election in 2000.

Election result
Labour held control of the control with 33 councillors after losing 1 seat to the Conservatives. The Conservative gain came in Windle, where Nancy Ashcroft joined her husband  as a councillor for the ward. This took the Conservatives to 5 seats on the council, while the Liberal Democrats remained on 15 seats. Overall turnout at the election was 26.4% and ranged between a low of 19.3% in West Sutton and a high of 36.93% in Rainford.

Ward results

By-elections between 2002 and 2003

References

2002 English local elections
2002
2000s in Merseyside